Orchard Street is a street in Manhattan which covers the eight city blocks between Division Street in Chinatown and East Houston Street on the Lower East Side. Vehicular traffic runs north on this one-way street. Orchard Street starts from Division Street in the south and ends at East Houston Street in the north..

History 

The orchard in question belonged to James Delancey, who returned to England in 1775, and his farm was declared forfeit. 

Orchard Street is often considered the center of the Lower East Side and is lined end to end almost entirely with low-rise tenement buildings with the iconic brick face and fire escapes. First part of Little Germany and later a Jewish enclave, the neighborhood has been home to immigrants from the mid-19th century to the present day. The street's past as the heart of the immigrant experience is captured at the Lower East Side Tenement Museum's centerpiece, the restored 97 Orchard Street tenement.

The street is known for its discount shopping, as Orchard Street was long the Lower East Side's main marketing thoroughfare. There are several lingerie shops and Orthodox Jewish-owned men's suit stores below Delancey Street, while discount clothing and luggage stores dominate the block between Delancey and Rivington Streets. More recently, upscale boutiques and designer shops have begun to line the street. Every Sunday, Orchard Street from Delancey to East Houston Street closes to vehicular traffic turning the street into a pedestrian mall with stores setting up tables and racks advertising their wares to passersby.

Like the rest of the Lower East Side, Orchard Street has gone through gentrification in the past decade, especially above Rivington Street, where boutiques and upscale restaurants have opened shop. 

The transition has been slower on the lower end of the street, especially below Grand Street, which is part of Chinatown's industrial east end, but new restaurants, bars and art galleries have opened in this area in recent years as well. 

Meanwhile, several luxury condominiums now stand or are under construction where immigrant families once shared quarters in cramped tenement buildings. Several boutique hotels have also sprouted in the area, with two on Orchard St; the Blue Moon Hotel at 100 Orchard St, and Thompson LES on Allen St.

In popular culture
A short film, "Orchard Street", was made in 1955 by Ken Jacobs, who used his new 16mm Bell & Howell camera to capture the life of the street one afternoon. Turner Classic Movies has shown it as an avant garde film.

Lower East Side resident and filmmaker Courtney Fathom Sell made Down Orchard Street over the course of four years. The documentary depicts the evictions suffered by many of the store-owners due to continuing gentrification of the neighborhood.

In the musical "Ragtime" the Latvian immigrant known as Tateh references the corner of Orchard and Rivington, where he makes a living creating silhouettes, in the song "Success": "With ordinary paper, a pair of scissors and some glue I will give you a thing of such beauty!"

Notable places
 The Blue Moon Hotel, 100 Orchard Street
 Lower East Side Tenement Museum, 97 Orchard Street
 Orchard Street Runners, 36 Ludlow Street (formerly 45 Orchard Street)
Scarr's Pizza, 22 Orchard Street

References
Notes

External links

 The Lower East Side Tenement Museum
 Urban75.org - 360-degree panorama view of Orchard Street
 Orchard Street Storefronts photographs of buildings and stores along Orchard St from Chinatown through the Lower East Side.
 New York Songlines: Orchard Street, a virtual walking tour
 Lower East Side Visitor Center, 54 Orchard

Streets in Manhattan
Lower East Side